Newark, Newark is a British television sitcom set in the Nottinghamshire town of Newark-on-Trent, England. The series aired on Gold on 28 March 2022, and revolves around the life of a recently divorced woman, her son and her ex-husband.

Synopsis
Recently divorced Maxine (Morgana Robinson) is trying to adapt to single life, after separating from Terry (Mathew Horne). Meanwhile, their 16-year-old son Leslie, is dealing with the confusion of coming out, while his grandmother (Beverley Callard), sticks her nose into every situation.

Cast
Morgana Robinson as Maxine
Mathew Horne as Terry
Beverley Callard as Pauline
 Jai Hollis as Leslie
 Jessie Mae Alonzo as Amber
 Vahid Gold as Rudy
 Saskia Chana as Claire
 Bo Poraj as Dariusz
 Oliver Woollford as Connor
 Nathan Foad as Rowan

Production
The show was written by Nathan Foad, himself from the Nottinghamshire town of Newark-on-Trent, the setting for the sitcom, and where it was filmed. The series was directed by Amanda Blue, produced by Kenny Tanner and the production company was Balloon Entertainment.

References

External links
 UKTV Gold webpage
 
 
 Newark Dictionary

2022 British television series debuts
2020s British sitcoms
English-language television shows
Gold (British TV channel) original programming
Newark-on-Trent
Television series about dysfunctional families
Television shows set in Nottinghamshire
Works about divorce